Duel of Fire (Italian: Duello nella Sila)   is a 1962 Italian adventure film directed by Umberto Lenzi. It starred Fernando Lamas and Liana Orfei. It was picked up for distribution in the US by AIP.

Cast

 Fernando Lamas: Antonio Franco
 Liana Orfei: Maruzza
 Armand Mestral: Rocco Gravina
 Lisa Gastoni: Miss Parker
 Enzo Cerusico: Policeman
 Daniela Igliozzi: Dina Franco
 Gino Buzzanca: Baron Carteri
 Nino Vingelli

References

External links

1962 films
Films directed by Umberto Lenzi
1962 adventure films
Italian adventure films
English-language Italian films
Films set in the 19th century
Italian films about revenge
1960s English-language films
1960s Italian films